Streptomyces cinereoruber is a bacterium species from the genus of Streptomyces which has isolated from soil. Streptomyces cinereoruber produces chinerubin A, chinerubin B, rhodomycin A and rhodomycin B.

See also 
 List of Streptomyces species

References

Further reading

External links
Type strain of Streptomyces cinereoruber at BacDive -  the Bacterial Diversity Metadatabase

cinereoruber
Bacteria described in 1957